John Gilchrist (1872 – 14 April 1947) was a Scottish socialist who became a political activist in New Zealand.

Political activity
Born in Scotland in 1872, Gilchrist was a member of the Scottish Independent Labour Party and emigrated to New Zealand in 1900. He joined the Wellington Socialist Party in 1901 and later was Secretary of the Fabian Society, PLL (Political Labour League) and LRC in Dunedin. He left the Labour Party over the issue of monetary reform.

A strong rationalist he was a shoemaker, bricklayer and insurance salesman. Gilchrist became a member of the Social Credit Party later in life and died on 14 April 1947 aged 74 years.

References

1872 births
1947 deaths
Independent Labour Party politicians
Independent Political Labour League politicians
New Zealand Socialist Party politicians
New Zealand Labour Party politicians
New Zealand social crediters
Scottish emigrants to New Zealand
Scottish socialists
Unsuccessful candidates in the 1919 New Zealand general election
Unsuccessful candidates in the 1922 New Zealand general election
Unsuccessful candidates in the 1925 New Zealand general election
Unsuccessful candidates in the 1931 New Zealand general election